Ommanandsing Kowlessur (born March 29, 1982) is a Mauritian athlete competing in the 200 and 400 metres. He placed fifth in the 400 metres at the 2005 Francophone Games, held in Niamey, Niger. In 2006, Kowlessur placed fourth in the 4 × 100 m relay at the Commonwealth Games in Melbourne, Australia.

Achievements

References

1982 births
Living people
Mauritian male sprinters
Athletes (track and field) at the 2002 Commonwealth Games
Athletes (track and field) at the 2006 Commonwealth Games
Commonwealth Games competitors for Mauritius
Athletes (track and field) at the 2007 All-Africa Games
African Games competitors for Mauritius